Nicolò Navigajoso was a Venetian diplomat and colonial official in the 1260s and 1270s.

In 1265 he was sent as ambassador to the Byzantine capital, Constantinople, along with Pietro Badoerio. In 1268–69 he was castellan of Coron in the Morea, together with Nicolò Miglani, who was likely the junior of the two. He was sent as one of a three-member embassy to Pope Gregory X in 1272, and, again along with Miglani, as ambassador to Serbia (Rascia) in 1275, after the Serbian king Stefan Uroš I had attacked Ragusa.

References

Sources 
 
 
 

13th-century births
13th-century Venetian people
Ambassadors of the Republic of Venice
Venetian governors
Ambassadors to the Byzantine Empire
Ambassadors to Serbia